Tauchira polychroa is a species of short-horned grasshopper in the family Acrididae. It is found in Southeast Asia.

References

Catantopinae